The International Association for Food Protection (IAFP), founded in 1911, is a non-profit association of food safety professionals based in Des Moines, Iowa. The organization claims a membership of over 3,000 members from 50 nations. The mission of the IAFP is to provide food safety professionals worldwide with a forum to exchange information on protecting the food supply.

The Association provides its members with an information network on scientific, technical, and practical developments in food safety and sanitation through its two scientific journals, Food Protection Trends and Journal of Food Protection, its educational Annual Meeting, and interaction with other food safety professionals.

Before 2000, it was known as the International Association of Dairy and Milk Inspectors (1911–1936), International Association of Milk Sanitarians (1936–1947), and International Association of Milk and Food Sanitarians, Inc. The name was changed in 1966 to the International Association of Milk, Food and Environmental Sanitarians. In 1999, it received the current name.

History
In the early 20th century, an increasing number of cities and states in the US passed policies to ensure safety of milk. The laws were a response to the food industry's deception at that time. There were types of alteration in milk products on the market, such as water-dilution or adding butter or cheaper substitutes. In addition, spoiled milk is danger to health: infant mortality rate was lower in cities that had monitored milk production and sale. The Association was established in 1911 based in Milwaukee, Wisconsin, and there were 35 members. One of the members was from Canada, and one from Australia; the rest were from the US. According to the Association's constitution, an object is to develop "uniform and efficient inspection of dairy farms, milk establishments, milk and milk products" by "men who have a thorough knowledge of dairy work." The object reflects the historical context when the Association was born.

In 1923, the Association deemed pasteurization as necessary for processing milk products, and endorsed pasteurization as the only adequate safeguard for milk supplies. US Public Health Service's annual report on milk-borne outbreaks has been decreased from 40–60 per year in the 1920s to about 20 per year after World War II.

In the 1960s, the Association had expanded its vision on food protection from milk safety. As the President of the Association pointed out in 1960: "Today, we sanitarians must be equipped to deal with problems extending throughout the entire range of environmental health. We must solve problems of waste disposal, insect and rodent control, air pollution, housing, radiological poisoning and many others. Additionally, with more Americans eating out more often than ever before, the food service industry has become an area of responsibility such as would have been impossible for our founding Members to imagine. Recently the packaging of prepared foods of the 'heat and eat' variety has developed as a rapidly expanding industry that poses new sanitation problems for you to solve." The name of the association was changed after a mail ballot in members at large in response to the expanded scope of the Association, the International Association of Milk, Food and Environmental Sanitarians (IAMFES).

Annual meeting
The IAFP annual meeting is held in late July or early August each year, and boasts an attendance of over 2,200 people from U.S. and foreign local and federal governments, academia, food safety consultants and the food industry.  Recent and future meeting locations are as follows:

2011—Milwaukee, Wisconsin
2012—Providence, Rhode Island
2013—Charlotte, North Carolina
2014—Indianapolis, Indiana
2015—Portland, Oregon
2016—St. Louis, Missouri
2017—Tampa, Florida
2018—Salt Lake City, Utah
2019—Louisville, Kentucky
2020—Cleveland, Ohio
2021—Phoenix, Arizona

References
IAFP History Book 1911-2001
IAFP Annual Meeting

Organizations established in 1911
Food technology organizations
Food safety organizations
Professional associations based in the United States
Organizations based in Des Moines, Iowa